is a Japanese cross-country skier.

He competed at the FIS Nordic World Ski Championships 2011 in Oslo, and placed 12th in 15 kilometre classical.

At the 2011 Asian Winter Games he won gold medals in the 10 kilometre classical event and in the 15 kilometre freestyle event.

References

External links
 Ski Association of Japan team member list 

1987 births
Living people
Japanese male cross-country skiers
Cross-country skiers at the 2014 Winter Olympics
Cross-country skiers at the 2018 Winter Olympics
Olympic cross-country skiers of Japan
Asian Games medalists in cross-country skiing
Tour de Ski skiers
Cross-country skiers at the 2011 Asian Winter Games
Asian Games gold medalists for Japan
Asian Games silver medalists for Japan
Asian Games bronze medalists for Japan
Medalists at the 2011 Asian Winter Games
21st-century Japanese people